Gravelford is an unincorporated community in Coos County, Oregon, United States.

The name of the community came from a natural ford in the stream. A post office with the name Gravel Ford was established in 1878 with Solomon J. McCloskey the first postmaster. Post office records always used the two-word spelling, but post office route maps and USGS topographical maps use the one-word spelling. The office closed in 1934, with mail going to Myrtle Point.

In 1915, Gravelford had two cheese factories, two churches, an Adventist academy, and a public school. As of 1990, only two houses remained of the town. Gravelford's volunteer fire department is a satellite station of Myrtle Point. Gravelford Cemetery was founded in 1884.

References

Unincorporated communities in Coos County, Oregon
1878 establishments in Oregon
Populated places established in 1878
Unincorporated communities in Oregon